Levering is an unincorporated community and census-designated place (CDP) in Emmet County in the U.S. state of Michigan. As of the 2010 census, the CDP had a population of 215.

Geography
Levering is located in northeastern Emmet County, in northern McKinley Township and southern Carp Lake Township. U.S. Highway 31 passes through the community, leading north  to Mackinaw City and south  to Pellston.

The community of Levering was listed as a newly-organized census-designated place for the 2010 census, meaning it now has officially defined boundaries and population statistics for the first time.

Demographics

References 

Unincorporated communities in Michigan
Unincorporated communities in Emmet County, Michigan
Census-designated places in Emmet County, Michigan
Census-designated places in Michigan